Hemmings Motor News (HMN) is a monthly magazine catering to traders and collectors of antique, classic, and exotic sports cars. It is the largest and oldest publication of its type in the United States, with sales of 215,000 copies per month, and is best known for its large classified advertising sections. The magazine counts as subscribers and advertisers practically every notable seller and collector of classic cars, including Jay Leno and his Big Dog Garage, and most collector car clubs are included in its directory.

The magazine was started by Ernest Hemmings in Quincy, Illinois, in 1954, then purchased by Terry Ehrich, who moved the operation to Bennington, Vermont in the late 1960s. Ehrich published the magazine until his death in 2002. The company was then acquired by American City Business Journals. Hemmings Motor News currently has 100 employees at its Bennington, Vermont headquarters.

Starting in 1970, HMN published Special Interest Autos (SIA), a bimonthly periodical focused primarily on American collectible automobiles. From 2000 to 2003, they published the muscle car and hotrod magazine Hemmings Rods and Performance. In 2003, it  was relaunched as Hemmings Muscle Machines, with muscle cars as its sole focus.

In 2004, shortly after the release of Hemmings Muscle Machines, Hemmings ended publication of SIA and began to develop its successor, Hemmings Classic Car, launched in October of that year. That was followed in 2005 by Hemmings Sports & Exotic Car.

Hemmings Motor News magazine also contains an approximately 80-page section of editorial content. Content includes coverage of collector-car shows and auctions, sports cars, touring cars, classic cars, pre-war cars and historic racing cars, as well as family-type automobiles.

HMN also sells a large line of calendars, clothing, signs, and other items relating to automobile collecting and memorabilia, and maintains a public display of 25 cars at their headquarters.

Hemmings executive editor Richard Lentinello left the company in 2020.

Hemmings Classic Car
Hemmings Classic Car, published by Hemmings Motor News, is a monthly magazine and successor of Special-Interest Autos, covering the topic of American, European and Japanese-built collector cars, targeting enthusiasts, owners, collectors, dealers, restorers and parts manufacturers.

Hemmings Classic Car captures several distinct collector-car audiences in a single publication, with an emphasis on early post-war 1946–1960 automobiles. Other categories include the pre-1916 Brass era cars, pre-war cars, CCCA-recognized Classic cars, and cars from the 1960s through the early 1980s.

Hemmings Classic Car features photography showcasing these automobiles at their best. In-construction photographs of the entire restoration process show readers what it takes to produce a concours-quality, show-winning restoration. It is the best-selling old-car magazine in the world.

Hemmings Sports & Exotic Car

Hemmings Sports & Exotic Car, published by Hemmings Motor News, is an automobile enthusiast magazine with content consisting solely of collector cars built outside the U.S. In 2008, it was the fastest growing automotive title in the U.S.
In March 2017, Hemmings sent a letter to subscribers of Sports and Exotic Car informing them that the May 2017 issue would be the last, much to the disappointment of their loyal followers. They cited "financial reasons" for the cancellation.

Hemmings Muscle Machines
Hemmings Muscle Machines is a monthly periodical magazine published by Hemmings Motor News which focuses on muscle cars from the postwar era to present. Content includes original cars, restorations, modified cars and new-production muscle cars.

Racing activities
In 1979, a team from Hemmings participated in the Cannonball Baker Sea-To-Shining-Sea Memorial Trophy Dash. In 1986, the same team of Terry Erich, former BMW factory motorcycle racer Justus Taylor and Hemmings editor-in-chief David Brownell entered the Great American Race, and Hemmings later became a primary sponsor of the race. In 2007, Hemmings ended their participation in what was now called the Great Race, and began participating in the Hemmings Vintage Car Rally. Hemmings' sponsorship of the Great Race resumed in 2011.

References

External links
 

1954 establishments in Illinois
Advance Publications
Automobile magazines published in the United States
Monthly magazines published in the United States
Conservation and restoration of vehicles
Magazines established in 1954
Magazines published in Illinois
Magazines published in Vermont